Ricardo Schlachter (born 7 July 1977) is a former professional tennis player from Brazil.

Biography
As a junior, Schlachter was runner-up in the boys' doubles at the 1994 Wimbledon Championships, with Vladimír Pláteník as his partner.

Schlachter, who comes from the city of Joinville in Santa Catarina State, turned professional in 1998 and that year qualified for the singles main draw at the Colombia Open. His other ATP Tour main draw appearances were all in doubles, partnering Gustavo Kuerten at the 1998 Movistar Open, then competing twice at the Brasil Open, in 2001 and 2002. He won two doubles titles on the ATP Challenger Tour.

Challenger titles

Doubles: (2)

References

External links
 
 

1977 births
Living people
Brazilian male tennis players
People from Joinville
Sportspeople from Santa Catarina (state)
21st-century Brazilian people
20th-century Brazilian people